Ymer Island is an island in northeastern Greenland. The island is a part of Northeast Greenland National Park.

Ymer Island is named after the Swedish geographical journal Ymer, which published many accounts of Swedish expeditions to Spitsbergen and Greenland. The journal had been named after the giant Ymir, the forefather of the Jotuns in Norse mythology.

Geography
The island lies on the southern side of the entrance of Kaiser Franz Joseph Fjord, with the Antarctic Sound separating it from the Suess Land Peninsula. Ymer Island's northern half forms a peninsula named Gunnar Anderson Land having its narrow isthmus in the west. The fjord between the two halves of the island is named Dusen Fjord.

Ymer Island has an area of 2,437 km2. It is mountainous; Angelin Bjerg, its highest peak, reaches a height of 1900 m. Celsius Bjerg is located at the southeastern end of the island.

The conspicuous Devil's Castle (Teufelsschloss) is located on the other side of Kaiser Franz Joseph Fjord, off the southern shore of Cape Petersens, the NW extremity of Ymer Island.

See also
List of islands of Greenland

References

External links

Uninhabited islands of Greenland
Ymir